Y Lolfa (Welsh for The Lounge) is a Welsh printing and publishing company based in Tal-y-bont, Ceredigion, in Mid-Wales. It publishes a wide variety of books in Welsh and English. It also provides a commercial print service. Y Lolfa was established in 1967 by Robat Gruffudd. It is now an independent, limited company run by the founder's sons, Garmon Gruffudd (managing director) and Lefi Gruffudd (general editor), with Paul Williams as production manager.

Using the new small offset printing method, it started producing material both for the activist Cymdeithas yr Iaith Gymraeg (The Welsh Language Society), with which it was loosely associated, and for its own publications which included Lol, the satirical magazine from which the company's name was derived.

The company gradually expanded the variety of its publications to include popular series for children, contemporary novels, diaries, humorous tutors for Welsh learners, a range for tourists to Wales and a Welsh sports title. It has adopted a deliberate policy of not adapting books from other languages in order to support Welsh artists and authors.

It was involved with the publication of Papur Pawb, one of the first Welsh community papers, in 1974.

Y Lolfa published Llyfr y Ganrif (The Book of the Century) in association with the National Library of Wales in 1999. It celebrated 50 years in business in 2017 and in 2017 employed twenty-two full-time staff, publishing around 80 titles annually.

References

External links 
Official website

Welsh-language literature
Publishing companies of Wales
Publishing companies established in 1967
1967 establishments in Wales
Companies based in Ceredigion